Jack Stuart Plotnick (born October 30, 1968) is an American film and television actor, writer, and producer.

Career
Plotnick is possibly best known for his role as Edmund Kay in the 1998 period drama Gods and Monsters, which won an Academy Award for Best Adapted Screenplay, and recurring roles on the television series Ellen and Buffy the Vampire Slayer, his role as part of the main cast of Drawn Together, his leading performance in the film Wrong and his drag persona, "Evie Harris" in Girls Will Be Girls. He had a recurring role on The Mentalist as Red John suspect Brett Partridge. Plotnick directed and co-wrote the 2014 science fiction comedy Space Station 76.

Personal life
Plotnick was born in Worthington, Ohio, the youngest of four children, and graduated from Worthington High School in 1987. He attended Carnegie Mellon University. Plotnick was raised Jewish, and is gay.

Awards
Along with co-stars Miss Coco Peru and Varla Jean Merman, Plotnick shared the Best Actor Grand Jury Award at Outfest 2003 and "Best Actress" honors at the 2003 U.S. Comedy Arts Festival for his role in Girls Will Be Girls.

Roles

Notable or recurring television roles
Supernatural — "It's a Terrible life" — Ian
Grace and Frankie — Paul
Criminal Minds — Tanner Johnson
The Mentalist — Brett Partridge 
Drawn Together — Xandir P. Whifflebottom
Lovespring International — Steve Morris
Buffy the Vampire Slayer — Deputy Mayor Allan Finch
Ellen — Barrett
Action — Stuart Glazer
Rude Awakening — Clark
Reno 911! — Steve Marmella, Deputy Patrick Bates
The Jenny McCarthy Show — (himself)
Seinfeld — "The Checks" (Sunshine Carpets crew leader)
Joan of Arcadia — Sammy #2
Lovespring International — Steve Morris
The Weird Al Show — Uncle Ralphie
Shark — Bradley Roberts
Nip/Tuck — Dr. George
Svetlana — Ted
Wizards of Waverly Place — Pocket Elf
True Jackson, VP — Matsor LaRue
Two and a Half Men — Mike
House, MD — Hal Connor
Z Nation  — Roman Estes

Select film roles
 Patient Seven (2016) — Dr. Paul Victor
Wrong (2012) — Dolph Springer
Sharpay's Fabulous Adventure (2011) — Neil Roberts
Rubber (2010) — Accountant
The Drawn Together Movie: The Movie! (2010) — Xandir
Sleeping Dogs Lie (2006) — Dougie
Adam & Steve (2005) — Mime
Straight-Jacket (2004) — Freddie Stevens
Girls Will Be Girls (2003) — Evie Harris
Down with Love (2003) — Maurice
Chairman of the Board (1998) — Zak
Gods and Monsters (1998) — Edmund Kay

Other Work
Plotnick performed in the July 2012 edition of Don't Tell My Mother! (Live Storytelling), a monthly showcase in which actors, authors, screenwriters and comedians share true stories they would never want their mothers to know.

In 2015 he released the e-book New Thoughts for Actors which he offers for free, writing "I wrote it as a way to give back to my community."

In 2018, he made a cameo in Brandon Rodgers' A Day at the Beach as Lyle Lemon. The video is currently on YouTube and has over 4 million views. He was also featured in Brandon Rodgers’ “North Pole Complaints (Offensive)” as Tiny Toni. As of right now, the video has 1.1 million views. In 2019, he made a cameo as Coach Best in Brandon Rogers' Blame the Hero episode 3 and 7.

Jack produces and stars in satirical videos inserting himself into old Wonderful World of Disney footage.

References

External links 

Official site

1968 births
Living people
Male actors from Ohio
American male film actors
American male television actors
American male voice actors
American drag queens
Jewish American male actors
People from Worthington, Ohio
American gay actors
LGBT people from Ohio
21st-century American Jews
LGBT Jews